Steet is a mountain in Sel Municipality in Innlandet county, Norway. The mountain is surrounded by several other notable mountains including Hoggbeitet, Ljosåbelgen, and Smiukampen to the southwest; Smiubelgen and Trolltinden to the northwest; Storsmeden and Veslesmeden to the north; and Svartnuten to the east.

See also
List of mountains of Norway by height

References

Sel
One-thousanders of Norway
Rondane National Park
Mountains of Innlandet